The Balmaceda family of Chile became politically influential during the 19th century, and played a very significant role in Chilean politics. The Balmaceda family is of Basque descent. They are members of the Castilian-Basque aristocracy in Chile.

Main branch 
Manuel José de Balmaceda Ballesteros (1803–1869), politician; Married to María Encarnación Fernández Salas
José Manuel Balmaceda Fernández (1840–1891), politician and President of Chile; Married to Emilia de Toro, First Lady of Chile
Pedro Balmaceda Toro (1868–1889), poet and editor
Enrique Balmaceda Toro (1878–1962), politician and minister
José Vicente Balmaceda Fernández (1845–1920), politician and soldier
José María Balmaceda Fernández (1846–1899), politician and minister
Carlos Balmaceda Saavedra (1879–1958), politician and minister
José Elías Balmaceda Fernández (1849–1917), politician and minister
José Rafael Balmaceda Fernández (1850–1911), politician and minister
Ernesto Balmaceda Bello (1887–1906), diplomat and murder victim
José Exequiel Balmaceda Fernández (1851–1887), politician and diplomat
José Daniel Balmaceda Fernández (1861–1905), politician
Daniel Balmaceda Fernández (1861–1905)
Ester Balmaceda Fontecilla; Married to Arturo Marín Vicuña (1879–?)
Raúl Marín Balmaceda (1907–1957), politician

Other members 
José Julio Balmaceda Bravo (1954), business journalist and entrepreneur
José Pedro Balmaceda Pascal (1975), Chilean-American actor.

See also
History of Chile

References

Balmaceda family
Balmaceda family